The Matador is an armoured personnel carrier (APC) and mine-protected vehicle that is produced by Paramount Group in South Africa. The vehicle was displayed for the first time in 2007, during the International Defence Exhibition and Conference in Abu Dhabi. The Matador was officially launched the following year, at the 2008 African Aerospace and Defence exhibition in Cape Town, South Africa.

Vehicle specs
With a curb weight of 10,800 kg and a payload weight of 4,500 kg, the Matador has a maximum crew capacity of fourteen, including a driver and co-driver. The vehicle has a cruise speed of 100 km/h and a maximum range of 700 km. Although it can be used for military and peacekeeping operations in urban areas, it was originally designed for missions in less built-up areas. It therefore has a larger turning circle compared to its sister vehicle, the Marauder, which was specifically developed for urban areas.

The Matador is either equipped with a militarised MAN engine integrated with a 12-speed semi-automatic transmission, or a Cummins engine integrated with a fully automated 6-speed transmission. Both technologies are common around the world, allowing the vehicle to be repaired and serviced in most countries, without requiring an independent logistic system.

Armour
The Matador is fitted with a double-skin monocoque hull, which gives it a modern look and a smooth finish while protecting its occupants against blasts up to STANAG 4569 Level III, the highest level of tested protection. The V-shaped hull comprises three self-jigging plates. This system, developed in South Africa, enables the Matador to withstand the blast of a double anti-tank mine (14 kg of TNT) at any point beneath the hull, and a triple anti-tank mine (21 kg of TNT) under any wheel.

Armament
The vehicle can be equipped with light and medium-calibre machine guns and cannon weapon installations, as well as mortar firing platforms, missile launchers, combat turret, and command, surveillance and control systems.

Functions
The Matador can be converted to serve various purposes and roles, such as armoured ambulance, command-post vehicle, or utility mine-protected vehicle.

Production
In 2008, for the manufacturing and production of the Matador, the Paramount Group liaised with King Abdullah II of Jordan and the Design and Development Bureau (KADDB), Jordan's primary governmental military institute for the possible development and manufacturing of defence systems.

In 2009, a deal was sealed with the government of the Republic of Azerbaijan to produce Matadors via knock down kits.

Operators

 
 : 13 sold in 2013.

References

Armoured fighting vehicles of the post–Cold War period
Armoured personnel carriers of South Africa
Military equipment of Azerbaijan
Military vehicles introduced in the 2000s
Wheeled armoured personnel carriers
Armoured personnel carriers of the post–Cold War period